The Ladoga ringed seal (Pusa hispida ladogensis), is a freshwater subspecies of the ringed seal (Pusa hispida) which are found entirely in Lake Ladoga in northwestern Russia. The subspecies evolved during the last ice age, about 11,000 years ago. As the glaciers retreated and water levels changed, the Baltic ringed seal (including Ladoga seals) was trapped in freshwater lakes and separated from the Arctic ringed seal.

It is related to the even smaller population of Saimaa ringed seals in Lake Saimaa, a lake that flows into Ladoga through the Vuoksi River.

Appearance
The adult Ladoga seal grows to about 150 cm in length and weighs approximately 60–70 kg. Pups are approximately 50–60 cm at birth and weigh approximately 4–5 kg. There are four variations of coats. About 47% of Ladoga seals have a dark brown coat with lighter ring shaped patterns, 29% have a dark brown coat with lighter vein-like patterns, and 17% have a light brown coat with a dark dorsal belt as well as faint rings and spots. The coats of the remaining 7% are not described by Popov. Annual molting takes place from April through June.

Reproduction
Females reach maturity at the age of four to five, and males at the age of six to seven. Pups are delivered in February through March, with weaning taking place after six to eight weeks. A normal lifespan is about 30–35 years.

Conservation

The current population is about 2,000–3,000, down from approximately 20,000 at the beginning of the 20th century, due to overhunting; hunting of the seals was banned entirely in 1980, but some illegal poaching still occurs. The species' primary threats include entanglement in fisheries netting, industrialization in the areas surrounding Lake Ladoga, fuel spills from water vessels and the disturbance of their warm-weather sunning places by human recreational activities. The Ladoga seal is listed as an Appendix II species under the Bern Convention and also included in the Red Data Book of the Russian Federation.

See also

 Pinniped
 Saimaa ringed seal

Notes

References
 IUCN Red List of Threatened Species
 Ladoga Seal
 Small comparison with Saimaa seal
 Seal Conservation Society
 Ladoga Seal in Brief
 Yablokov, A. (1985) Marine mammal-fishery interactions in the Baikal and Ladoga Lakes and in the Caspian and White Seas. in: Beddington, J.R., Beverton, R.J.H. and Lavigne, D.M. (eds.): Marine Mammals and Fisheries, pp. 106–110, George Allen & Unwin (Publishers) Ltd, London

Phocins
Mammals of Russia
Pinnipeds of Europe
ESA endangered species